J.J. Ambrose (born February 6, 1987) is an American mixed martial artist currently competing in One Fighting Championship. He has also competed for Bellator's Lightweight division, Affliction and Pacific Xtreme Combat.

Background
Ambrose was born in Long Beach, California and later moved to Arizona after his parents divorced. He is of Italian descent and began wrestling in the fifth grade, began boxing in high school, and then began Brazilian jiu-jitsu in his senior year of high school, his first fight later that year. Ambrose graduated from Mohave High School in Bullhead City, AZ.

Mixed martial arts career

Early career
Ambrose made his professional mixed martial arts debut in 2005, fighting mainly for California-based promotions. After compiling a record of ten wins, two losses and one no contest, he signed with Affliction.

Affliction
Ambrose faced Mike Pyle on July 19, 2008 at Affliction: Banned. He lost via submission in the first round.

Pacific Rim organizations and The Ultimate Fighter
After winning a bout in Mexico, Ambrose obtained more six wins in a row for Pacific Rim promotions as Pacific Xtreme Combat.

Ambrose also appeared in the first episode of The Ultimate Fighter: Team GSP vs. Team Koscheck. He lost via unanimous decision against Sevak Magakian during the entry round.

In 2012, Ambrose signed with Bellator to compete in the Lightweight Tournament.

Bellator Fighting Championships
Ambrose faced Brent Weedman on March 23, 2012 at Bellator 62 in the quarterfinal match of the season six lightweight tournament. He lost via submission in the second round.

Ambrose faced Brian Warren on January 17, 2013 at Bellator 85. He won via submission in the second round.

Ambrose faced David Rickels on October 11, 2013 at Bellator 103. Ambrose lost the bout via technical knockout in the third round.

Over four years since his fight with Rickels, Ambrose faced Saad Awad at Bellator 193 on January 26, 2018. He lost the fight via unanimous decision.

Post Bellator
Ambrose faced Spike Carlyle on October 17, 2021 at Cage Warriors 130. He lost the bout via knockout in the second round.

Ambrose faced Jordan Bailey on September 23, 2022 at Cage Warriors 143. He lost the bout via guillotine choke in the second round.

Mixed martial arts record

|-
|Loss
|align=center|35–10 (2)
|Jordan Bailey
|Submission (guillotine choke)
|Cage Warriors 143
|
|align=center|2
|align=center|3:05
|San Diego, California, United States
|
|-
|Win
|align=center|35–9 (2)
|Hoshi Friedrich
|Submission (guillotine choke)
|Hex Fight Series 23
|
|align=center|2
|align=center|N/A
|Melbourne, Australia
| 
|-
| Loss
| align=center|34–9 (2)
| Spike Carlyle
|KO (punch)
|Cage Warriors 130
|
|align=center|2
|align=center|1:19
|San Diego, California, United States
| 
|-
| Win
| align=center|34–8 (2)
| Kitt Campbell
| Decision (unanimous)
| Hex Fight Series 20
| 
| align=center| 3
| align=center| 5:00
| Melbourne, Australia
|
|-
| Win
| align=center|33–8 (2)
| Akihiro Murayama
| Decision (unanimous)
| Pancrase 306
| 
| align=center| 3
| align=center| 5:00
| Tokyo, Japan
|
|-
| Win
| align=center|32–8 (2)
| Art Hernandez
| Submission (guillotine choke)
| WFC 104
| 
| align=center|1
| align=center|3:57
| Laughlin, Nevada, United States
|
|-
| Win
| align=center|31–8 (2)
| Beau Rawiri
| Submission (guillotine choke)
| Hex Fight Series 18
| 
| align=center|1
| align=center|2:35
| Melbourne, Australia
|
|-
| Win
| align=center|30–8 (2)
| Alaa Mansour
| Submission (guillotine choke)
| Wawan MMA 18
| 
| align=center|1
| align=center|1:10
| Kuwait
| 
|-
| Loss
| align=center|29–8 (2)
| Saad Awad
| Decision (unanimous)
| Bellator 193
| 
| align=center|3
| align=center|5:00
| Temecula, California, United States
|
|-
| Win
| align=center| 29–7 (2)
| Ben Wall
| Decision (unanimous)
| Hex Fight Series 9
| 
| align=center| 3
| align=center| 5:00
| Melbourne, Victoria, Australia
|
|-
| Win
| align=center| 28–7 (2)
| Takahiro Ashida
| Submission (guillotine choke)
| Pacific Xtreme Combat 56
| 
| align=center| 4
| align=center| N/A
| Mangilao, Guam
|
|-
| Win
| align=center| 27–7 (2)
| Dylan Fussell
| Decision (unanimous)
| Pacific Xtreme Combat 55
| 
| align=center| 3
| align=center| 5:00
| Mangilao, Guam
| 
|-
| Win
| align=center| 26–7 (2)
| Francisco Treviño
| Submission (guillotine choke)
| Hex Fight Series 6
| 
| align=center| 2
| align=center| 4:35
| Melbourne, Victoria, Australia
|
|-
| Win
| align=center| 25–7 (2)
| Fabio Mello
| TKO (punches)
| Gladiators Fighting Championship 9
| 
| align=center| 2
| align=center| 3:48
| Mishref, Kuwait
| 
|-
| Loss
| align=center|24–7 (2)
| Francisco Treviño
| Decision (split)
| Hex Fight Series 5
| 
| align=center| 3
| align=center| 5:00
| Melbourne, Victoria, Australia
|
|-
|Win
|align=center|24–6 (2)
|Oriol Gaset
|Submission (guillotine choke)
|Hex Fight Series 4
|
|align=center|1
|align=center|2:57
|Melbourne, Victoria, Australia
|
|-
|Win
|align=center|23–6 (2)
|Ricky Legere
|Submission (guillotine choke)
|KOTC: Bitter Rivals
|
|align=center|1
|align=center|1:36
|Ontario, California, United States
|
|-
|Loss
|align=center|22–6 (2)
|Kazuki Tokudome
|Decision (unanimous)
|Pancrase: 267
|
|align=center|3
|align=center|5:00
|Tokyo, Japan
|
|-
|Win
|align=center|22–5 (2)
|Ahmad Ibrahim
|Submission (guillotine choke)
|Gladiator Fighting Championship 6
|
|align=center|2
|align=center|0:48
|Kuwait City, Kuwait
|
|-
|Win
|align=center|21–5 (2)
|Adam Gonzalez
|Submission (rear-naked choke)
|WFC: World Fighting Championships 21
|
|align=center|1
|align=center|1:21
|Laughlin, Nevada, United States
|
|-
|Loss
|align=center|20–5 (2)
|David Rickels
|TKO (punches)
|Bellator 103
|
|align=center|3
|align=center|2:37
|Mulvane, Kansas, United States
|
|-
|Win
|align=center|20–4 (2)
|Ibrahim Ahmed
|Submission (rear-naked choke)
|Gladiator Fighting Championship 3
|
|align=center|1
|align=center|3:27
|Kuwait City, Kuwait
|
|-
|NC
|align=center|19–4 (2)
|Ibrahim Ahmed
|No Contest
|Gladiator Fighting Championship 2
|
|align=center|1
|align=center|2:00
|Kuwait City, Kuwait
|
|-
|Win
|align=center|19–4 (1)
|Brian Warren
|Submission (guillotine choke)
|Bellator 85
|
|align=center|2
|align=center|0:50
|Irvine, California, United States
|Catchweight (165 lb) bout.
|-
|Win
|align=center|18–4 (1)
|Mu Gyeom Choi
|KO (punch)
|PRO FC 7
|
|align=center|2
|align=center|N/A
|Taipei, Taiwan
|
|-
|Loss
|align=center|17–4 (1)
|Brent Weedman
|Submission (Von Flue choke)
|Bellator 62
|
|align=center|2
|align=center|3:26
|Laredo, Texas, United States
|Bellator Season 6 Lightweight Tournament Quarterfinal
|-
|Win
|align=center|17–3 (1)
|Sebastien Garguier
|Decision (unanimous)
|Pacific Xtreme Combat 27
|
|align=center|3
|align=center|5:00
|Mangilao, Guam, United States
|
|-
|Win
|align=center|16–3 (1)
|Robert Palacios
|Submission (punches)
|Rites of Passage 11
|
|align=center|1
|align=center|1:59
|Saipan, Northern Mariana Islands, United States
|
|-
|Win
|align=center|15–3 (1)
|Masakazu Taguchi
|TKO (punches)
|Trench Warz 13
|
|align=center|1
|align=center|1:01
|Saipan, Northern Mariana Islands, United States
|
|-
|Win
|align=center|14–3 (1)
|Gyo Pyung Hwang
|Technical submission (D'arce choke)
|Pacific Xtreme Combat 20
|
|align=center|1
|align=center|3:20
|Mangilao, Guam, United States
|
|-
|Win
|align=center|13–3 (1)
|Bill Saures
|Submission (guillotine choke)
|Pacific Xtreme Combat 18
|
|align=center|1
|align=center|1:45
|Mangilao, Guam, United States
|
|-
|Win
|align=center|12–3 (1)
|Hideto Kondo
|Submission (rear-naked choke)
|Pacific Xtreme Combat 17
|
|align=center|1
|align=center|3:26
|Mangilao, Guam, United States
|
|-
|Win
|align=center|11–3 (1)
|Iure Silva
|Submission (armbar)
|Cage of Fire 14
|
|align=center|3
|align=center|2:19
|Guadalajara, Jalisco, Mexico
|
|-
|Loss
|align=center|10–3 (1)
|Mike Pyle
|Submission (rear-naked choke)
|Affliction: Banned
|
|align=center|1
|align=center|2:51
|Anaheim, California, United States
|
|-
|Win
|align=center|10–2 (1)
|Jason Cordero
|Submission (rear-naked choke)
|Total Fighting Alliance 10
|
|align=center|1
|align=center|1:14
|Santa Monica, California, United States
|
|-
|Win
|align=center|9–2 (1)
|Iure Silva
|Submission (rear-naked choke)
|Cage of Fire 10
|
|align=center|1
|align=center|3:43
|Mexico
|
|-
|Win
|align=center|8–2 (1)
|Jason Cordero
|Submission (rear-naked choke)
|Total Fighting Alliance 8
|
|align=center|1
|align=center|2:59
|Santa Monica, California, United States
|
|-
|Win
|align=center|7–2 (1)
|Marco Soto
|TKO (punches)
|Cage of Fire 9
|
|align=center|1
|align=center|N/A
|Mexico
|
|-
|Win
|align=center|6–2 (1)
|Adam Lehman
|Submission (guillotine choke)
|Total Fighting Alliance 7
|
|align=center|1
|align=center|1:43
|Santa Monica, California, United States
|
|-
|Win
|align=center|5–2 (1)
|Ben Gonzalez
|TKO (punches)
|Total Fighting Alliance 6
|
|align=center|2
|align=center|2:06
|Santa Monica, California, United States
|
|-
|NC
|align=center|4–2 (1)
|Adam Lehman
|No Contest
|Total Fighting Alliance 5
|
|align=center|1
|align=center|1:29
|Santa Monica, California, United States
|
|-
|Win
|align=center|4–2
|Andrew Flores
|Decision (unanimous)
|Total Fighting Alliance 4
|
|align=center|3
|align=center|5:00
|Carson, California, United States
|
|-
|Win
|align=center|3–2
|Jason Zickerman
|Submission (rear-naked choke)
|California Xtreme Fighting 2
|
|align=center|1
|align=center|2:36
|Upland, California, United States
|
|-
|Loss
|align=center|2–2
|Vince Guzman
|Submission (triangle choke)
|California Xtreme Fighting 1
|
|align=center|2
|align=center|2:48
|Upland, California, United States
|
|-
|Loss
|align=center|2–1
|Luke Hodges
|Decision (unanimous)
|Total Combat 11
|
|align=center|3
|align=center|5:00
|Yuma, Arizona, United States
|
|-
|Win
|align=center|2–0
|Adam Lehman
|Decision (unanimous)
|WFC: Rumble at the Ramada
|
|align=center|3
|align=center|N/A
|Norwalk, California, United States
|
|-
|Win
|align=center|1–0
|Donald Bolt
|N/A
|Kage Kombat
|
|align=center|N/A
|align=center|N/A
|California, United States
|

Personal life
Ambrose owns and operates a gym, STEEL Athletics in Guam.

References

1987 births
Living people
American male mixed martial artists
Welterweight mixed martial artists
Lightweight mixed martial artists
Mixed martial artists utilizing boxing
Mixed martial artists utilizing wrestling
Mixed martial artists utilizing Brazilian jiu-jitsu
American practitioners of Brazilian jiu-jitsu
Sportspeople from Santa Clara, California